Juan Bravo Dávila y Cartagena (1629–1690) was a Roman Catholic prelate who served as Bishop of Córdoba (1688–1690).

Biography
Juan Bravo Dávila y Cartagena was born in Cuzco, Peru on 22 August 1629.
On 29 August 1687, he was selected by the King of Spain as Bishop of Córdoba and confirmed by Pope Innocent XI on 24 November 1687.
On 21 November 1688, he was consecrated bishop by Manuel de Mollinedo Angulo, Bishop of Cuzco. 
He served as Bishop of Córdoba until his death on 4 December 1690.

References 

17th-century Roman Catholic bishops in Argentina
Bishops appointed by Pope Innocent XI
1629 births
1690 deaths
Roman Catholic bishops of Córdoba